The 2022 season was the Miami Dolphins' 53rd in the National Football League (NFL), their 57th overall, the first under new head coach Mike McDaniel, and seventh under general manager Chris Grier.

The Dolphins made the playoffs for the first time since 2016, finishing with three straight winning seasons for the first time since the 2001–2003 seasons. With an 8–3 record by Week 12, the Dolphins had their best start since the 2001 season. However, despite starting the season 8–3, the Dolphins suffered a late-season collapse, losing five straight games. However, they won their final regular-season game over the New York Jets to earn another winning season, matching their 9–8 record from the previous year, and made it into the playoffs for the first time since 2016. The Dolphins attempted to get their first playoff win since 2000; however, despite a late rally, Miami fell to division rival Buffalo, 34–31.

Some notable moments from the regular season include Miami’s first win over Buffalo and Detroit since the 2018 and 2006 seasons, respectively, their first away win over Baltimore since 1997, and their first loss at home to Minnesota since 1976. They were also part of the “Butt Punt” which became a meme on social media.

Draft

Draft trades

Staff

Final roster

Preseason

Regular season

Schedule

Note: Intra-division opponents are in bold text.

Game summaries

Week 1: vs. New England Patriots

Head coach Mike McDaniel recorded his first win as a head coach and became the first Dolphins coach since Nick Saban in 2005 to win their first game as Dolphins head coach, as well as the first head coach in Dolphins history to win their head coaching debut. Quarterback Tua Tagovailoa joined former Denver Broncos quarterbacks John Elway and Jake Plummer as the only QBs to beat a Bill Belichick-coached team at least three times without a loss. With the win, the Dolphins began the season 1–0. The win was the 497th in Dolphins history.

Week 2: at Baltimore Ravens

The Dolphins defeated the Ravens on the road for the first time since the two teams' inaugural meeting in 1997. The game saw the Dolphins trail by as much as 21 points at two separate times in the game (down 7–28 at halftime and later 14–35 at the end of the 3rd quarter). Facing almost certain defeat,  quarterback Tua Tagovailoa orchestrated four touchdown drives late in the game during the fourth quarter (including back-to-back 40+ yard scores to Tyreek Hill) to tie the game up at 35–35. The Ravens attempted to end the game with a 51-yard field goal courtesy of Justin Tucker to go ahead 38–35, but on the ensuing drive, Tagovailoa hit Jaylen Waddle for the game-winning touchdown with 14 seconds left to make the score 42–38. The Dolphins' defense held for the rest of the game, and hung on for the comeback win, and left M&T Bank Stadium with a stunned partisan crowd of Raven fans behind. Tagovailoa finished the game with a career-high 469 passing yards and six touchdowns and receivers Waddle and Hill became the first pair of teammates in NFL history to catch 10 passes for over 150 yards and two touchdowns in the same game. With the win, the Dolphins improved to 2–0.  It was also Miami’s first ever win at M&T Bank Stadium (the Dolphins’ 1997 win was at War Memorial Stadium and the 42 points scored exceeded the 39 combined points they’d scored in four previous trips to the Ravens’ stadium. The win was the 498th in Dolphins history.

Week 3: vs. Buffalo Bills

The undefeated Bills traveled south to visit the Dolphins, back home at Hard Rock Stadium. In a tightly-contested game that was kept within a 1-score possession the entire game, it was a Chase Edmonds touchdown that gave Miami the lead for good, 21–17. Toward the end of the game, a notable incident happened. With Miami lined up in punt formation, punter Thomas Morstead fielded the ball and kicked it with no issue; however, the ball went straight into the rear end of Dolphins blocker Trent Sherfield, who was lined up too close to Morstead. The ball bounced out of bounds for a safety, which cut the score to 21–19. The blocked punt would quickly be coined as "The Butt Punt" by fans online. Despite a desperate late drive by Josh Allen and the Bills' offense, Miami held on for the nail-biting win.  This was the Dolphins' first win over the Bills since Week 13 of the 2018 season. With the win, the Dolphins improved to 3–0, their first such start since 2018. The win also marked their 499th victory in franchise history (including playoff games), bringing them one victory away from reaching 500 wins.

Following the game, CBS showed footage of Bills offensive coordinator Ken Dorsey throwing his headseat and playbook onto a table repeatedly in frustration. The footage, although brief, quickly went viral online and soon became a meme. The Dolphins were also criticized for keeping Tagovailoa, who had apparently suffered a concussion from slamming his head on the ground after being hit by Bills linebacker Matt Milano, in the game, instead ruling that he had suffered a "back injury".

Week 4: at Cincinnati Bengals

The Dolphins' chance at clinching their 500th victory in franchise history came to a screeching halt against a Bengals team still looking to find its footing. Quarterback Tua Tagovailoa, who was cleared to play after being a game-time decision due to his injury from the previous game, was carted off the field after suffering a head injury from a sack by Bengals defender Josh Tupou in the late 2nd quarter. Backup Teddy Bridgewater stepped in for Tagovailoa beginning in the 3rd quarter, where he threw for 193 yards, 1 touchdown, and 1 interception. With the loss, the Dolphins fell to 3–1.

Following the game, it was officially revealed that Tagovailoa had suffered a concussion, leading to considerable backlash against the organization and the NFL regarding the handling of concussions.

Week 5: at New York Jets

Quarterback Teddy Bridgewater made his first start in a Miami Dolphins uniform and just seconds into the game, suffered a concussion that would cause Miami's 3rd string quarterback and 2022 7th round pick Skylar Thompson to enter the game. In the Dolphins' first loss to the Jets since 2019 and their largest loss to the Jets since 2004, Thompson threw for 166 yards and 1 interception in his NFL debut. With the loss, the Dolphins fell to 3–2.

Week 6: vs. Minnesota Vikings

Rookie quarterback Skylar Thompson made his first career start due to starters Tua Tagovailoa and Teddy Bridgewater dealing with concussions. Throwing for just 89 yards, Thompson's first career start was cut short due to a thumb injury he suffered during the 2nd quarter. Bridgewater, who previously played for Minnesota from 2014–2017, played in relief for Thompson, where he threw for 329 yards, 2 touchdowns, and 2 interceptions. In the 4th quarter, wide receiver Jaylen Waddle fumbled the ball, later recovered by Vikings safety Harrison Smith would cost the Dolphins the game, and it marked their first home loss to the Vikings since 1976. With the loss, the Dolphins fell to 3–3.

Week 7: vs. Pittsburgh Steelers

In the Dolphins' first Sunday Night game since 2017, quarterback Tua Tagovailoa played his first game since suffering a severe concussion in Week 4 that would cause the NFL to change it's concussion protocols. Former Dolphins head coach and current Steelers senior defensive assistant/linebackers coach Brian Flores made his first return to Hard Rock Stadium since his abrupt firing from the Dolphins in January 2022. The 50th anniversary of the 1972 undefeated Dolphins were also honored at halftime and the team wore 50th anniversary patches along with throwback uniforms for commemoration. That same season, the Dolphins defeated the Steelers in the AFC Championship Game 21–17. In a heavily defensive game, which saw both defenses hold their opposition scoreless for the entire second half, Tagovailoa threw for 261 yards and a touchdown pass in his first game back from a concussion, and despite numerous injuries throughout the game that drained the defense, including a season-ending leg injury to safety Brandon Jones in the 3rd quarter, cornerback Noah Igbinoghene intercepted a throw by Steelers quarterback Kenny Pickett in the final seconds of the game to hand Pittsburgh their first 2–5 start since 2013 to end a nail-biting 16–10 slugfest. With their 500th win in franchise history, the Dolphins improved to 4–3.

Week 8: at Detroit Lions

The Dolphins flew to Ford Field following their close victory against the Steelers at home to play the slumping Detroit Lions. This was Lions head coach Dan Campbell's first time facing the Dolphins in 7 years, as he previously served as their tight ends coach from 2011–2015 under head coaches Tony Sparano and Joe Philbin, and later the interim head coach for much of the 2015 season. In the first quarter, Miami found themselves in a deep hole early on as the Lions went up 14–0 thanks to a Jamaal Williams touchdown and a D'Andre Swift receiving touchdown from Jared Goff. The Dolphins halved the deficit after Tua Tagovailoa hit Jaylen Waddle for a 5-yard touchdown to make the score 14–7. In the second quarter, the exhausted Dolphin defense allowed a quick touchdown from Williams again, courtesy of an efficient, quick 5-play drive that preceded the score. Miami, however would respond with a quick touchdown drive of their own after Tagovailoa hit Waddle for the pair's second touchdown following a quick 3-play drive that included a long strike to Tyreek Hill to cut the score to 21–14. The Lions responded with a Michael Badgley field goal to put the game back to a two-score deficit, but Miami would add a field goal of their own (courtesy of Jason Sanders) to narrow the lead to within 7. Following a defensive stop by the Dolphins, the Lions lined up to punt for what would have been the first time all game, but a clever trick play fake converted the 4th and 2 and kept the drive alive. Detroit capitalized, and added another field goal to go into halftime up 10, 27–17. For the rest of the game, however, the Lions' once high-scoring offense was completely neutralized by a rejuvenated Dolphin defense, which shut out Detroit during the entire second half. The Dolphins capitalized, and in the third quarter hung 14 points on a gassed Detroit defense, courtesy of an Alec Ingold touchdown and a Mike Gesicki touchdown reception from Tagovailoa to make the score 31–27. Both defenses took over during the fourth quarter, and the Dolphins ran out the clock and hung on for the win and Miami's first win over Detroit since 2006. With the victory, Miami improved to 5–3 on the season, and 5–0 in games where Tagovailoa was their starting quarterback.

Week 9: at Chicago Bears

With the win, the Dolphins improved to 6–3.

Week 10: vs. Cleveland Browns

This was the Dolphins' first game since 2003 where they didn't record a punt. It was also Cleveland quarterback Jacoby Brissett's first return to Hard Rock Stadium since last season. Brissett played for the Dolphins in 2021, where he started 5 games and recorded a 2–3 record as Miami's starter that year. Head coach Mike McDaniel also faced the Browns for the first time in 8 years, previously serving as Cleveland's wide receivers' coach under then-head coach Mike Pettine during the 2014 season. McDaniel revealed on September 23, 2022 that he used clips of NBA Hall of Famer Allen Iverson to guide his receivers during his lone season in Cleveland. It would also mark the first time since 2009 that the Dolphins scored over 30 points in 3 straight games. With the win, the Dolphins improved to 7–3, their best start within 10 games since the 2001 season.

Week 12: vs. Houston Texans
{{Americanfootballbox
|titlestyle=;text-align:center;
|state=autocollapse
|title=Week 12: Houston Texans at Miami Dolphins – Game summary
|date=November 27
|time=1:00 p.m. EST
|road=Texans
|R1=0|R2=0|R3=6|R4=9
|home=Dolphins
|H1=10|H2=20|H3=0|H4=0
|stadium=Hard Rock Stadium, Miami Gardens, Florida
|attendance=66,205
|weather=Partly cloudy, 
|referee=Jerome Boger
|TV=CBS
|TVAnnouncers=Spero Dedes, Jay Feely and Aditi Kinkhabwala
|reference=Recap, Game Book
|scoring=
First quarter
MIA – Jason Sanders 45-yard field goal, 10:21. Dolphins 3–0. Drive: 9 plays, 39 yards, 3:01.
MIA – Durham Smythe 4-yard pass from Tua Tagovailoa (Jason Sanders kick), 2:57. Dolphins 10–0. Drive: 8 plays, 59 yards, 4:44.
Second quarter
MIA – Jeff Wilson 3-yard run (Jason Sanders kick), 12:22. Dolphins 17–0. Drive: 1 play, 3 yards, 0:05.
MIA – Jason Sanders 23-yard field goal, 6:22. Dolphins 20–0. Drive: 10 plays, 72 yards, 4:32.
MIA – Xavien Howard 16-yard fumble return (Jason Sanders kick), 4:59. Dolphins 27–0.MIA – Jason Sanders 35-yard field goal, 0:00. Dolphins 30–0. Drive: 11 plays, 71 yards, 1:52.Third quarterHOU – Dare Ogunbowale 3-yard run (run failed), 10:21. Dolphins 30–6. Drive: 6 plays, 64 yards, 3:10.Fourth quarterHOU – Jordan Akins 25-yard pass from Kyle Allen (pass failed), 12:46. Dolphins 30–12. Drive: 6 plays, 50 yards, 2:25.
HOU – Ka'imi Fairbairn 28-yard field goal, 9:00. Dolphins 30–15. Drive: 8 plays, 57 yards, 2:47.
|stats=Top passersHOU – Kyle Allen – 26/39, 215 yards, TD, 2 INT
MIA – Tua Tagovailoa – 22/36, 299 yards, TDTop rushersHOU – Dare Ogunbowale – 4 rushes, 14 yards, TD
MIA – Jeff Wilson – 13 rushes, 39 yards, TDTop receiversHOU – Jordan Akins – 5 receptions, 61 yards, TD
MIA – Tyreek Hill – 6 receptions, 85 yards
}}
With the win, the Dolphins improved to 8–3.

Week 13: at San Francisco 49ers

This was head coach Mike McDaniel's first return to Levi's Stadium since leaving the Niners to become the Dolphins head coach in February 2022. McDaniel previously served as the offensive and run game coordinator for San Francisco under head coach Kyle Shanahan from 2017 to 2021, appearing in Super Bowl LIV in 2020. It was also Dolphins running backs Raheem Mostert and Jeff Wilson's first returns to Levi's Stadiums. With the loss, the Dolphins fell to 8–4 and snapped a 5-game winning streak.

Week 14: at Los Angeles Chargers

Week 15: at Buffalo Bills

Week 16: vs. Green Bay PackersChristmas Day games'Despite Miami taking a 20–13 halftime lead, the Packers came back and won due to 13 unanswered 2nd-half points and suddenly sloppy play from Tagovailoa during the second half, who was later revealed to have suffered another concussion right before halftime.

Week 17: at New England Patriots

Week 18: vs. New York Jets

Standings
Division

Conference

Postseason

Schedule

Game summaries
AFC Wild Card Playoffs: at (2) Buffalo Bills

Statistics

Team

IndividualStatistics correct as of the end of the 2022 NFL season''

Awards and honors

References

External links
 

Miami
Miami Dolphins seasons
Miami Dolphins